The 1986 New England Patriots season was the franchise's 17th season in the National Football League and 27th overall. The Patriots matched their 11–5 record from the previous season, but this time they finished first in the AFC East, thus winning the division title. This would be the last AFC East Division title the Patriots would win until 1996 and their last playoff appearance until 1994.

Staff

Roster

Regular season

Schedule

Game summaries

Week 8

Standings

See also 
 New England Patriots seasons

References 

New England Patriots
AFC East championship seasons
New England Patriots seasons
New Eng;and Patriots
Sports competitions in Foxborough, Massachusetts